The PCC II is a series of upgraded PCC streetcars used by the Southeastern Pennsylvania Transportation Authority, in Philadelphia, Pennsylvania, for its Route 15-Girard Avenue.

Background

In the 1980s, SEPTA was in the process of upgrading its Subway–Surface Trolley Lines, replacing its fleet of PCCs with new light rail cars.  Some lines, such as Routes 60, 50, 53, and 6 were converted to buses, while Routes 23, 56, and 15 continued to use PCCs into the 1990s.  In 1992, SEPTA ended streetcar service on these three lines as well.  In response to public outcry over the conversion, SEPTA stated that the suspension of these lines' streetcar service was temporary, and that they would be restored in 1997.  However, during this time little was done to restore the lines, and as 1997 approached, it became clear that SEPTA had no immediate plans to restore streetcar service to these lines.

In September 1997, at a City Council hearing, Jack Leary, SEPTA's general manager at the time, announced plans to restore streetcar service to only one of the three lines, Route 15. The initial proposal was to purchase twelve low-floor articulated light rail cars, to make some existing railcars available for the line. However, this was found to be prohibitively costly, and the decision was made instead to rehabilitate older cars for the service.  To this end, SEPTA sent eighteen of its retired PCC cars to the Brookville Equipment Company to be rebuilt, with another six to be used for parts.

The first of the rebuilt cars debuted on September 9, 2003, and Route 15 was planned to open little under a year later.  However, the line remained closed for another year due to disputes with local residents on 59th Street over parking on the street. During this time, the cars remained stored in the Callowhill depot, although they were occasionally used for special charters on the Subway–Surface routes. The cars entered full service on September 4, 2005.

By 2020, 14 of the 18 cars were unable to pass their internal mechanical inspections, thus prompting an early suspension of service on the Girard Avenue line to allow for refurbishments. (Plans had called for a shorter disruption to accommodate track refurbishment and a highway expansion, but this was initiated early when the breadth of mechanical issues were discovered.) As of 2022, rebuilding of the PCC II fleet continues.

Design

Essentially, the PCC II is a completely new car built within an old PCC car's shell. All new motors and brakes based on the PCC B3 truck design have been installed, as well as new air-conditioning units. The cars feature control consoles resembling those of SEPTA's modern Kawasaki light rail cars, as well as revised interiors with reused seats from retired SEPTA Volvo-built buses. The rear doorway has been widened and features a wheelchair lift, thus making the PCC IIs the first streetcars  operated by SEPTA to be ADA-accessible.

The cars are painted in a unique green, red, and cream livery, nearly identical to that of the PCC cars of SEPTA's predecessor, the Philadelphia Transportation Company, as well as featuring a modified "wing" logo, which features the SEPTA "S" symbol in place of the "P-T-C" lettering.

See also

 Port Authority 4000 Series PCC

References

SEPTA
Streetcars of the United States
600 V DC multiple units
Brookville streetcars
Electric multiple units of the United States